Lord of Chaos is a fantasy novel  by American author Robert Jordan, the sixth book of his series The Wheel of Time. It was published by Tor Books and released on October 15, 1994, and was nominated for the Locus Award for Best Fantasy Novel in 1995. Lord of Chaos consists of a prologue, 55 chapters, and an epilogue. It is the first book of the Wheel of Time to have an epilogue.

Plot summary

With many of the seals on his prison broken, the Dark One has grown in power. He causes global warming, revives the Forsaken Aginor and Balthamel as Osan'gar and Aran'gar, and creates Shaidar Haran, his Myrddraal incarnation.

In response to Rand al'Thor's amnesty on male channelers, Mazrim Taim swears allegiance to him. Together they form the Black Tower, which trains male channelers called Asha'man. Rand is diplomatically courted by both the rebel Aes Sedai in Salidar, who send an envoy to Caemlyn, and the Aes Sedai of the White Tower, who send an envoy (many of which are in fact Black Ajah) to Cairhien. In an unsuccessful attempt to control Rand, Alanna Mosvani of the rebel Aes Sedai bonds Rand as her Warder against his will. Additionally, Min Farshaw, who had traveled with the Salidar Aes Sedai, reunites with Rand and gives him much-needed emotional support. Rand later discovers Salidar's location and sends Mat Cauthon there, to retrieve Elayne Trakand who will rule Caemlyn and Cairhien in his stead.

Perrin Aybara leaves the Two Rivers to join Rand in Caemlyn.

The deposed Queen of Andor, Morgase Trakand, goes to Amadicia for aid in returning to the throne but is instead taken captive by the Lord Captain Commander of the Children of the Light, Pedron Niall.

In Salidar, Elayne and Nynaeve al'Meara have made numerous magical discoveries thanks to Moghedien, who they secretly hold in captivity. In a feat previously believed to be impossible even in the Age of Legends, Nynaeve Heals Siuan Sanche, Leane Sharif, and Logain Ablar, restoring their abilities to channel. Egwene al'Vere is named the Amyrlin of the rebel Aes Sedai and travels to Salidar through Tel'aran'rhiod. Upon arrival, she unofficially raises Nynaeve and Elayne to Aes Sedai and sends them and Aviendha to Ebou Dar to search for a ter'angreal called the "Bowl of the Winds" to break the Dark One's control of the climate. Mat arrives at this time and reluctantly goes with them. After their departure, Egwene secretly arranges the escape of Logain, who then goes to the Black Tower. Aran'gar infiltrates Salidar and frees Moghedien.

Shortly after Perrin joins him, Rand is kidnapped by Elaida's Aes Sedai, who torture him en route to Tar Valon. Learning of the kidnapping, Perrin leads Rand's followers to the climactic Battle of Dumai's Wells. At the end of the battle, the rebel Aes Sedai are forced to swear fealty to the Dragon Reborn while the surviving White Tower Aes Sedai remain captives.

Battle of Dumai's Wells
The Battle of Dumai's Wells occurs in Chapter 55 of this book.

Forces

Pro-Dragon forces
Led by Perrin Aybara

 Wolves
Led by Perrin
1000 wolves

 Two Rivers Men
Led by Dannil Lewin
300 men (archers)
 Cairhienin Men
Led by Dobraine Taborwin
500 Men

 Winged Guards (from Mayene)
Led by Havien Nurelle
200 Men

 Asha'man
Led by Mazrim Taim, the M'hael ("Leader" in the Old Tongue)
200 Asha'man fought

 Salidar Aes Sedai
9 Aes Sedai fought, along with their 16 Warders

 Wise Ones
Led by Sorilea, an Aiel
94 Wise Ones

 Other Aiel
Led by Rhuarc, Clan Chief of the Taardad Aiel
~6,000 Aiel from various societies
Only siswai'aman and Maidens of the Spear were brought along for the battle. The other Aiel (besides the Wise Ones) dared not fight Aes Sedai.
Distinguished from the Shaido Aiel by red headbands (siswai'aman) or cloth tied around their arms (Maidens).

Anti-Dragon forces
Commanded by Galina Sedai of the Red Ajah, secretly of the Black Ajah

 Tower Aes Sedai
Led by Galina Casban Aes Sedai
Numbered 33 in total, including Galina

 Shaido Aiel
Led by Sevanna, widow of both the recently deceased acting Shaido clan chief Couladin & the previous chief Suladric
Numbered about 40,000

 Younglings
Led by Gawyn Trakand
600 men; all wearing green

The battle
Initially, the pro-Rand armies are situated on a ridge around Dumai's Wells. The Shaido have betrayed the Aes Sedai and have surrounded a group of wagons on which the Aes Sedai are situated, and are trying unsuccessfully to overwhelm its defenders to kidnap Rand al'Thor for themselves when the Pro Rand forces arrive.

The Two Rivers men, Cairhienin, Aiel and Winged Guards are to charge down into the valley after an attack of wolves, with Perrin at their head. The Salidar Aes Sedai and Wise Ones are to stay up on the ridge. However, when fighting, Perrin sees some Salidar Aes Sedai fighting.

The Pro-Rand forces fight their way in, but against far superior numbers they're only able to penetrate so far before they can go no further. In the thick of battle, about 200 Asha'man led by Mazrim Taim Travel to Dumai's Wells, emerge from their gateways and immediately kill any Shaido they see. They are instrumental in turning the tide of the battle.

When three of the Tower Aes Sedai shielding Rand leave to join the battle (leaving only 3 instead of the usual, and needed, 6 Aes Sedai guarding him to maintain his shield), Rand manages to break through the shield thanks to Lews Therin Telamon's help, reaching saidin and breaking out of the chest in which he was trapped. He stills all three of the Aes Sedai shielding him in the rush to break free. Rand finds Min beneath pieces of the exploded chest, but she is unharmed. He cuts her bonds and leads her out into the battle.  Rand then continues knocking unconscious and shielding more Tower Aes Sedai from within their lines, weakening their defence against the Shaido and their Wise Ones. As he is using saidin they are unable to detect him. Gawyn Trakand rides up, and wants to take Min away, but she refuses. She tells Gawyn that his sister Elayne Trakand loves Rand; Gawyn, believing rumors that say Rand killed his mother, swears that he will see Rand die one day before wheeling away and retreating with his Younglings.

The 200 Asha'man create a dome of Air around the wagons, to keep the remaining Shaido Aiel out. Some Asha'man are holding 23 Tower Aes Sedai hostage. Some of Rand's allies are inside the dome; Perrin and Loial are two such. The rest of his allies (e.g. several Wise Ones, Rhuarc) are outside of the dome, still fighting. The shield cannot be raised to admit his allies without letting the Shaido in.

So Rand orders the Asha'man to "send a message" to Sevanna. He hopes that his allies who are outside of the dome will see what is happening, and get away before they get hurt. Mazrim Taim, the M'hael, orders the Asha'man to raise the dome by two spans. The Shaido Aiel who are now within the dome are then killed as they literally explode when the Asha'mans' weaves touch them. A "Rolling Ring of Earth and Fire" causes the ground around the dome to split and fire to pour out from its cracks. The Shaido, now terrified, break and run, thousands dead left behind in their wake.

After the battle, the nine Salidar Aes Sedai come over to congratulate Rand. However, Rand is angered that the Salidar Aes Sedai disobeyed his orders in bringing more than the allotted number of sisters, offers them the choice of being treated like the Tower Aes Sedai, kept prisoner by the Asha'man or swearing an oath of fealty to him.  After Mazrim Taim adds, "Kneel and swear to the Lord Dragon, or you will be knelt," the Salidar Aes Sedai kneel and swear.

References

External links

Detailed summaries of each chapter from http://www.encyclopaedia-wot.org
Review at http://www.rpg.net/
Lord of Chaos at Worlds Without End
 (hardcover)
 (paperback)

1994 American novels
1994 fantasy novels
American fantasy novels
The Wheel of Time books
Novels by Robert Jordan
Tor Books books